USCGC Cape Shoalwater was a  type "C"  constructed at the Coast Guard Yard at Curtis Bay, Maryland in 1958 for use as a law enforcement and search and rescue patrol boat.

Design
The Cape class was designed originally for use as a shallow-draft anti-submarine warfare (ASW) craft and was needed because of the increased tension brought about by the Cold War. Cape Shoalwater was a type "C" Cape class and was never fitted with ASW gear because the Coast Guard's mission emphasis had shifted away from ASW to search and rescue by the time she was built. The hull was constructed of steel and the superstructure was aluminum. She was powered by four Cummins VT-600 diesel engines.

History
The Cape class was originally developed as an ASW boat and as a replacement for the aging, World War II vintage, wooden  patrol boats that were used mostly for search and rescue duties. With the outbreak of the Korean War and the requirement tasked to the Coast Guard to secure and patrol port facilities in the United States under the Magnuson Act of 1950, the complete replacement of the 83-foot boat was deferred and the 95-foot boat was used for harbor patrols. The first 95-foot hulls were laid down at the Coast Guard Yard in 1952 and were officially described as "seagoing patrol cutters". The class was named for North American geographic capes.

The Cape class was replaced by the   beginning in the late 1980s and many of the decommissioned cutters were transferred to nations of the Caribbean and South America by the Coast Guard.

After commissioning, Cape Shoalwater was assigned a homeport at Mayport, Florida where she was used for law enforcement and search and rescue (SAR) missions. She and her crew earned the Navy Expeditionary Medal for operations relating to the Cuban refugee exodus from 3 January 1961 until 23 October 1962.

In 1963, her homeport was moved to Fort Lauderdale, Florida. In 1988, the cutter participated in the seizure of the yacht Monkey Business after marijuana was found on board.

Notes

Citations

References used

 
 
 
 
 
 

1958 ships
Shoalwater
Ships built by the United States Coast Guard Yard
Cape-class cutters of the Royal Bahamas Defence Force